Clear Creek is a creek in Snohomish County, Washington. It is a tributary of the Sauk River and enters the river just above the community of Darrington.

Course
The creek rises in Clear Lake near Granite Pass in the Boulder River Wilderness. It briefly flows east before soon turning north. About  after turning north, the creek is joined by one of its largest tributaries, Copper Creek. After receiving Copper Creek, the creek turns northeast. It flows northeast for about  until it turns north again at its confluence with another major tributary, Helena Creek. Just above the mouth of Helena Creek, the creek drops over Asbestos Falls. Just below the Helena Creek confluence, the creek is joined by tiny Asbestos Creek, which drops over tall Asbestos Creek Falls just before entering Clear Creek. From there, the creek flows north for about 2 miles to its confluence with the Sauk. The creek is joined by Burns Creek just above where it enters the Sauk.

See also
List of rivers in Washington

External links

Rivers of Washington (state)
Rivers of Snohomish County, Washington